Hijas de la luna (English: Moon Daughters) is a Mexican telenovela that premiered on 19 February 2018 on Las Estrellas, and concluded on 10 June 2018. The telenovela is produced for Televisa by Nicandro Díaz González, based on the 1997 Colombian telenovela written by Bernardo Romero Pereiro and entitled Las Juanas. It stars Michelle Renaud and Danilo Carrera as main characters.

Plot 
The telenovela chronicles four sisters: Juana Victoria (Michelle Renaud), a young woman who works in an inn and lives in Mexico City; Juana Soledad (Jade Fraser), a young lady who is a nurse; Juana Bárbara (Lorena Graniewicz), a regiomontana who practices boxing; and Juana Inés (Geraldine Galván), a Puebla novice.

On her deathbed, Juana Victoria's mother, Rosaura, reveals to her that her real father is a man named Juan Oropeza (Omar Fierro), a hotelier from Mazatlan, Sinaloa. She goes to meet him and discovers that in addition to having a half-brother, Sebastián (Danilo Carrera), there is a possibility that she has three half sisters as well. Sebastián and Juana Victoria are given the task of finding them, and that is how a story begins full of romance, adventures, and unexpected encounters.

Cast

Main 
 Michelle Renaud as Juana Victoria Ramírez Nieto
 Danilo Carrera as Sebastián Oropeza
 Jade Fraser as Juana Soledad García
 Geraldine Galván as Juana Inés Bautista
 Lore Graniewicz as Juana Bárbara Treviño
 Omar Fierro as Juan Oropeza
 Alexis Ayala as Darío Iriarte
 Mario Morán as Mauricio Iriarte San Román
 Mariluz Bermúdez as Estefanía Iriarte San Román
 Eugenia Cauduro as Teresa
 Arcelia Ramírez as Margarita
 Marco Uriel as Xavier Oropeza
 Gonzalo Peña as Fernando Ruíz Melgarejo
 Jonathan Becerra as Octavio Sánchez
 Miguel Martínez as Todoelmundo
 Jorge Gallegos as Raymundo
 Jackie Sauza as Carla Vásquez
 Héctor Ortega as Padre Camilo
 José María Nieto as Mundito
 Bea Ranero as Adela
 Sergio Acosta as Ernesto Cifuentes
 Archie Lafranco as Jerome
 Cynthia Klitbo as Leonora Ruíz de Oropeza

Guest stars 
 Francisco Gattorno as Alberto
 Isaura Espinoza as Madre Superiora
 Mari Carmen Vela as Maité
 Eduardo MacGregor
 Alejandra Barros as Rosaura
 Ricardo Franco as Genaro
 Espinoza Paz as Himself
 Mariana Juárez as Herself

Ratings 
 
}}

Episodes

Special

Awards and nominations

References

External links 
 

2018 telenovelas
Mexican telenovelas
Televisa telenovelas
Las Estrellas original programming
Teen telenovelas
2018 Mexican television series debuts
2018 Mexican television series endings
Mexican television series based on Colombian television series
Spanish-language telenovelas